Nimvar (also Romanized as Nīmvar) is a village in Zanus Rastaq Rural District, Kojur District, Nowshahr County, Mazandaran Province, Iran. At the 2006 census, its population was 99, in 34 families.

References 

Populated places in Nowshahr County